Sharon Camille Farmer (born June 10, 1951) is an American photographer. She was the first African-American woman to be hired as a White House photographer and the first African American and first female to be Director of the White House Photography office.

Biography
Farmer was born and raised in Washington, D.C. and graduated from Ohio State University in 1974 with a degree in photography. While a student she became a member of Delta Sigma Theta sorority, vice president of the student government, and served as editor for the school newspaper, Our Choking Times.

Career
Farmer started her career in 1974 shooting album covers. Her freelance photography grew to photojournalism and she worked for Smithsonian Institution, The Washington Post and the American Association for the Advancement of Science.

In 1993, Sharon Farmer was hired to photograph for The White House covering President Bill Clinton and first lady Hillary Rodham Clinton.  Later, Farmer was promoted to Director of White House Photography and became the first African American and first woman to hold this position.

Farmer's work has been included in multiple exhibits, including: "Songs of My People,"  "Art against AIDS," "Gospel in the Projects," "Twenty Years on the Mall," "Washington, DC-Beijing Exchange," and "Our View of Struggle."

Academia
Sharon Farmer majored in photography and minored in music at Ohio State University in Columbus, Ohio, where she received her Bachelor of Arts degree.

References

External links

American photojournalists
Ohio State University College of Arts and Sciences alumni
Living people
Journalists from Washington, D.C.
American women journalists
1951 births
White House photographers
Photographers from Washington, D.C.
African-American photographers
African-American women journalists
African-American journalists
20th-century American journalists
20th-century American photographers
21st-century American journalists
20th-century American women photographers
21st-century American women artists
20th-century African-American women
21st-century African-American women
21st-century African-American artists
Women photojournalists